Rosellinia is a genus of fungi in the family Xylariaceae consisting of over 90 species. Several of the species in this genus are plant pathogens. Fossils of Rosellinia have been found in 12 million year old rocks from central England.

The genus was circumscribed by Giuseppe De Notaris in Giorn. Bot. Ital. vol.1 (Issue 1) on page 334 in 1844.

The genus name of Rosellinia is in honour of Ferdinando Pio Rosellini (1814–1872), who was an Italian mathematician and botanist.

Species
This is a complete listing of all currently accepted species in Rosellinia, based on the 2005 study by Petrini and Petrini.

R. abscondita —
R. aquila —
R. arcuata —
R. asperata —
R. beccariana —
R. bicolor —
R. bonaerensis —
R. bothryna —
R. breensis —
R. brevifissurata —
R. britannica —
R. bunodes —
R. buxi —
R. canzacotoana —
R. caudata —
R. chusqueae —
R. communis —
R. congesta —
R. corticium —
R. culmicola —
R. decipiens —
R. desmacutispora —
R. desmazieresii —
R. diathrausta —
R. dingleyae —
R. dolichospora —
R. emergens —
R. erianthi —
R. etrusca —
R. eucalypticola —
R. euterpes —
R. evansii —
R. formosana —
R. franciscae —
R. freycinetiae —
R. gigantea —
R. gigaspora —
R. gisborniae —
R. glabra —
R. griseo-cincta —
R. helvetica —
R. herpotrichoides —
R. horrida —
R. hughesii —
R. hyalospora —
R. immersa —
R. indica —
R. johnstonii —
R. lamprostoma —
R. longispora —
R. macdonaldii —
R. macrosperma —
R. macrospora —
R. mammiformis —
R. mammoidea —
R. markhamiae —
R. mastoidiformis —
R. medullaris —
R. megaloecia —
R. megalosperma —
R. megalospora —
R. merillii —
R. mimosae —
R. musispora —
R. mycophila —
R. necatrix —
R. nectrioides —
R. nothofagi —
R. novae-zelandiae —
R. palmae —
R. paraguayensis —
R. pardalios —
R. pepo —
R. perusensis —
R. petrakii —
R. petrinii —
R. picta —
R. procera —
R. puiggiarii —
R. radiciperda —
R. rhopalostilicola —
R. rhypara —
R. rickii —
R. saccardii —
R. samuelsii —
R. sancta-cruciana —
R. stenasca —
R. subiculata —
R. subsimilis —
R. thelena —
R. thelena var. microspora —
R. thindii —
R. victoriae

References

External links
Rosellinia at Pyrenomycetes of Southwestern France Descriptions and photos of many European species.

Xylariales
Sordariomycetes genera
Taxa named by Giuseppe De Notaris
Taxa described in 1844